Extension theorem may refer to:
 Carathéodory's extension theorem - a theorem in measure theory, named after the Greek mathematician Constantin Carathéodory
 Dugundji extension theorem - a theorem in topology, named after the American mathematician James Dugundji
 Extension Lemma - a lemma in topology (resp. functional analysis), related to the Tietze extension theorem
 Hartogs' extension theorem - a theorem in the theory of functions of several complex variables
 Isomorphism extension theorem - a theorem in field theory
 Kolmogorov extension theorem - a theorem in probability theory, named after the Soviet mathematician Andrey Nikolaevich Kolmogorov
 Krein extension theorem - a theorem  in functional analysis, proved by the Soviet mathematician Mark Grigorievich Krein
 M. Riesz extension theorem - a theorem in mathematics, proved by Marcel Riesz
 Szpilrajn extension theorem - a theorem in set theory, proved by Edward Szpilrajn
 Tietze extension theorem - a theorem in topology, named after the Austrian mathematician Heinrich Franz Friedrich Tietze
 Urysohn extension theorem - a theorem in topology, named after the mathematician Pavel Samuilovich Urysohn
 Whitney extension theorem - a theorem in mathematical analysis, named after the American mathematician Hassler Whitney
 Kreps extension theorem - a theorem in financial mathematics, ensuring that incomplete markets can be completed by adding the right securities